Appel or APPEL may refer to:

Places
 Appel, Germany, a municipality in Lower Saxony, Germany
 Appel, Netherlands, a hamlet in the Dutch province of Gelderland

Other uses 
 Appel (surname), including list of people with the surname
 Appel reaction, an organic chemical reaction 
 A fencing term
 Association L'APPEL, a French charity

See also 
 Appell, a surname
 Apel (disambiguation)
 Apple (disambiguation)
 De Appel, a contemporary arts centre, Amsterdam, Netherlands